Le Régiment du Saguenay is a Primary Reserve infantry regiment of the Canadian Forces based in Saguenay, Quebec.  The regiment was founded in 1900 in Roberval, Quebec as the 18th Saguenay Battalion of Infantry.

See also

 The Canadian Crown and the Canadian Forces
 Military history of Canada
 History of the Canadian Army
 Canadian Forces

References

 regiments.org
 DND website

Order of precedence

Saguenay, Regiment du
Saguenay, Quebec
Infantry regiments of Canada in World War II
Military units and formations established in 1900
1900 establishments in Quebec